Aneriophora is a little-known genus of hoverflies from South America. It contains only one species, Aneriophora aureorufa. The genus was originally named Eriophora by Rodolfo Amando Philippi (1865); this name was preoccupied by Eriophora Simon, 1864, so it was renamed to Aneriophora by Stuardo and Cortés (1952).

References

Diptera of South America
Hoverfly genera
Taxa named by Rodolfo Amando Philippi